Harvey E. Larsen (September 8, 1879 – 1960) was a member of the Wisconsin State Assembly.

Personal life
Larson was born in Green Bay, Wisconsin on September 8, 1879 to Hans Larsen (1843–1886), an immigrant from Engelstrup, Denmark, and his wife Maren (1842–1914). He died in 1960 and is buried at Eastside Cemetery in Denmark, Wisconsin.

Political career
Larsen was elected to the Assembly in 1946, 1950 and 1952. He was also chairman of Denmark, Wisconsin. He was a Republican.

References

Politicians from Green Bay, Wisconsin
1879 births
1960 deaths
American people of Danish descent
People from Denmark, Wisconsin
Republican Party members of the Wisconsin State Assembly